Kaviraj is an Indian lyricist, writer and film director. He is best known for writing lyrics for Kannada films since his debut in 2003 for the film Kariya. He has written lyrics for over 2000 feature film songs for more than 1000 movies and has won many awards including Filmfare Awards South twice and Mirchi music best lyrics writer award 2009,2011,2013, 2015. and 2019 He is considered one of the top  lyricists of Kannada cinema in the present times.

Kaviraj debuted as a film director with the 2016 film, Maduveya Mamatheya Kareyole. He directed his second movie in 2019 by the title Kalidasa Kannada Meshtru starring veteran comedy hero Jaggesh became big hit and also critically well acclaimed for its social concern script on education system

Awards
 South Indian International Movie Awards
Best Lyricist for "Gaganave Baagi" – Sanju Weds Geetha (2011)
Mirchi Music Awards South
Mirchi Music Awards Best Lyricist – he won 4 times 2009, 2011,2013 and 2015
 Filmfare Awards South
 Filmfare Award for Best Lyricist – Sanju Weds Geetha
 Filmfare Award for Best Lyricist – Aptharakshaka (2010)

References

External links
 Kaviraj' songs at Raaga.com
 Kaviraj Interview at PixMonk.com

Filmfare Awards South winners
Year of birth missing (living people)
Living people
Kannada-language lyricists
Indian male songwriters
People from Shimoga
Film musicians from Karnataka
20th-century Indian composers
21st-century Indian composers
20th-century male musicians
21st-century male musicians